Harrison Orovianor Omokoh (born 12 December 1981) is a Nigerian footballer.

References

External links

1981 births
Living people
Nigerian footballers
Nigeria international footballers
Nigerian expatriate footballers
Hapoel Be'er Sheva F.C. players
Expatriate footballers in Israel
FC Dynamo Kyiv players
FC Dynamo-2 Kyiv players
FC Dynamo-3 Kyiv players
FC Arsenal Kyiv players
FC Volyn Lutsk players
FC Vorskla Poltava players
SC Tavriya Simferopol players
FC Zorya Luhansk players
Plateau United F.C. players
FC Arsenal-Kyivshchyna Bila Tserkva players
Ukrainian Premier League players
Expatriate footballers in Ukraine
Nigerian expatriate sportspeople in Ukraine
Nigerian expatriate sportspeople in Israel
Association football defenders
Sportspeople from Warri